The following is a list of squads for each region competing in the 2011 UEFA Regions' Cup qualifiers.

Group A

Andalucia
Head coaches: Miguel Morilla Cabeza and Julián Roales Teba

Cantabria
Head coach: Manuel Costales

Group B

Galicia

Head coach: Carlos Ballesta

Group C

Group D

Group E

Notes

Spanish stage of the UEFA Regions' Cup